The Jamaica–Van Wyck station is a station on the IND Archer Avenue Line of the New York City Subway, located on the west side of the Van Wyck Expressway between Metropolitan Avenue and 89th Avenue on the border of Kew Gardens and Richmond Hill, Queens. It is served by the E train at all times.

History

Planning and opening

The plans for the Archer Avenue Lines emerged in the 1960s under the city and MTA's Program for Action. It was conceived as an expansion of IND Queens Boulevard Line service to a "Southeast Queens" line along the right-of-way of the Long Island Rail Road Atlantic Branch towards Locust Manor, and as a replacement for the dilapidated eastern portions of the elevated BMT Jamaica Line within the Jamaica business district which business owners and residents sought removal of. Both lines would meet at the double-decked line under Archer Avenue. The two-track spur from the Queens Boulevard Line would use the original Van Wyck Boulevard bellmouths. The IND line was to continue as a two-track line along the LIRR Atlantic Branch. It would have run through Locust Manor and Laurelton stations, with stops at Sutphin Boulevard, Parsons Boulevard (which was called Standard Place in planning documents), Linden Boulevard, Baisley Boulevard, and Springfield Boulevard.

Design on the station began on October 1, 1974 and was completed on August 18, 1982 by MLA/Brodsky. Construction on Section 7 of Route 131D, the Southeast Queens Line, which included the Jamaica–Van Wyck station started on October 17, 1979. At this point, the segment of the Archer Avenue Line under the Van Wyck Expressway had been completed. Because of the 1975 New York City fiscal crisis, the Archer Avenue Line was never fully built to Springfield Boulevard, and was instead truncated to Parsons Boulevard. Bids for the station project were received on December 3, 1982, and the project was awarded to Carlin Construction & Development Corporation for $12.781 million. Work on the station began on December 15, 1982. The station opened along with the rest of the Archer Avenue Line on December 11, 1988. It serves as the replacement for the former Metropolitan Avenue and Queens Boulevard stations of the BMT Jamaica Line.

Later years 
To save energy, the MTA installed variable-speed escalators at Jamaica–Van Wyck and three other subway stations in August 2008, although not all of the escalators initially functioned as intended.

In 2020, the MTA announced that it would reconstruct the track and third rail on the IND Archer Avenue Line, which had become deteriorated. From September 19 to November 2, 2020, E service was cut back to Jamaica–Van Wyck, with a shuttle bus connecting to Sutphin Boulevard and Jamaica Center.

Station layout

This underground station has two tracks and a  island platform. The E stops here at all times. As with other stations constructed as part of the Program for Action, the Jamaica–Van Wyck station contained technologically advanced features such as air-cooling, noise insulation, CCTV monitors, public announcement systems, electronic platform signage, and escalator and elevator entrances. This station has five escalators and two elevators.

The track walls are mostly orange. The mezzanine is suspended above the Jamaica-bound track via heavy cables linked to the station roof. On the Manhattan-bound side, the station walls contain spaces for skylights to allow natural sunlight in, but they are currently covered over.

North (railroad south) of the station, the tracks lead trains to the IND Queens Boulevard Line, where they either switch to the line's local or express tracks depending on the time of day.

Exits

The Jamaica–Van Wyck station has two entrances. One entrance is at the southwest corner of Van Wyck Expressway and 89th Avenue next to Jamaica Hospital Medical Center. This contains two escalators, an elevator, and one stair to street level. The other entrance is at Metropolitan Avenue and Jamaica Avenue, and contains one up-only escalator and a street stair. Two escalators and one staircase connect the platform with the mezzanine.

Notes

References

External links

 
 Station Reporter — E Train
 The Subway Nut — Jamaica–Van Wyck Pictures
 Metropolitan Avenue entrance from Google Maps Street View
 89th Avenue entrance from Google Maps Street View
 Platform from Google Maps Street View

Archer Avenue Line stations
Program for Action
New York City Subway stations in Queens, New York
Railway stations in the United States opened in 1988
Richmond Hill, Queens